Siose Muliumu (born 26 April 1976 in Auckland, New Zealand) is a New Zealand rugby league player who played professionally for Whitehaven and later represented the United States.

Early years
Muliumu attended St Paul's College in Auckland and played for the City-Pt Chev team in the Auckland Rugby League competition. Muliumu represented the Junior Kiwis in 1994 and 1995.

Playing career
Muliumu joined Whitehaven in England while they were being coached by New Zealander Stan Martin. He is regarded as one of Whitehaven's top forwards in the last twenty years.

He played for the Wentworthville Magpies in the 2006 Jim Beam Cup.

Muliumu then joined the New Haven Warriors in the AMNRL where he was the competitions MVP in 2008. He represented the United States at the 2009 Atlantic Cup and was the Rugby League International Federation's 2009 USA player of the year. He scored two tries for the Warriors in the 2010 AMNRL Grand Final. In 2013 he played for the Southampton Dragons in the AMNRL.

References

1976 births
Living people
Expatriate rugby league players in England
Expatriate rugby league players in the United States
Junior Kiwis players
Limoux Grizzlies players
New Haven Warriors players
New Zealand expatriate rugby league players
New Zealand expatriate sportspeople in England
New Zealand expatriate sportspeople in the United States
New Zealand rugby league players
People educated at St Paul's College, Auckland
Point Chevalier Pirates players
Rugby league players from Auckland
Rugby league props
Southampton Dragons players
United States national rugby league team players
Wentworthville Magpies players
Whitehaven R.L.F.C. players